The Kurchatov Center for Synchrotron Radiation and Nanotechnology (KCSRN) is a Russian interdisciplinary institute for synchrotron-based research. The source is used for research in fields such as biology, chemistry, physics and palaeontology.

As with all synchrotron sources, the Kurchatov source is a user facility.

History 
Construction began in 1986. The building was almost finished in 1989, but economic difficulties caused delays leading to final completion in December, 1999.

Electron accelerator 
The electron accelerator for the Kurchatov synchrotron was built by Budker Institute of Nuclear Physics, a world leader in accelerator physics. The magnetic structure  is very similar to that of the ANKA synchrotron in Karlsruhe. The accelerator includes an injection system, the Sibir-1 booster and the Sibir-2 storage ring. Injection is done at 450 MeV, but an upgrade program was expected to raise the energy level.

References

Synchrotron radiation facilities